Laxman Singh Rathore is an Indian scientist, former Director General of India Meteorological Department, New Delhi. and permanent representative of India with World Meteorological Organization, United Nations.

Education
He obtained his secondary and senior secondary school education from Chopasani School, Jodhpur and bachelor's degree from Bhupal Nobles College, Udaipur. Dr Rathore completed his Masters and doctoral degrees in Agriculture (Soil Science) from Rajasthan College of Agriculture, Udaipur.

Career
Rathore has joined India Meteorological Department in the year 1980 as Meteorologist. He is an agrometeorologist and played a leading role in setting up the weather based agricultural advisory service in India. He served as Vice President of Commission of agriculture Meteorology, World Meteorological Organization, United Nations. He is acclaimed weather forecaster. He has communicated all happenings about Cyclone Phailin and Cyclone Hudhud to media saving lives and properties. He retired from the service in the end of July 2016. He is Member of the executive council of WMO, Chairman of SAARC Meteorological Research Centre. He participated in Indian Scientific expedition to Antarctica in 1983–84.
Dr Rathore served as President of Indian Meteorological Society and also President of Association of Agrometeorologists.

Dr. Laxman Singh Rathore became Director General of Meteorology, India Meteorological Department (IMD) in 2012 and served as DG till 2016. He made immense contribution towards improving the skill of weather forecast, particularly the extreme weather events like cyclones, extreme temperatures, heavy precipitation etc. leading to enhance the use and impact of meteorological information in various sectors of economic activities and in saving lives and properties. His role in development of Agro-Meteorological Service in India and other countries of South Asia is noteworthy.

Dr Rathore had served as Vice Chair as well as Chair (Acting) of Intergovernmental Board for Climate Service (IBCS) and played a key role in development of GFCS. As a Member of WMO Executive council; Vice President, Commission for Agriculture Meteorology of WMO; Member management board, WMO Commission for Agriculture Meteorology; Chairman, Governing Council of SAARC Meteorological Research Centre, Dhaka; Co-Chair, Working Group for Indo-US co-operation on ‘Weather and Climate Forecasting for Crop Management; Visiting Scientist, University of Nebraska, Nebraska, USA, as UN fellow; Member, Task Team on capacity building in meteorology and allied sciences for Regional Association II (Asia) of WMO and Member; Member, Indo-US collaboration on meteorological application for risk reduction in agriculture, he made noteworthy contribution in meteorological and allied arena at global level.

Dr Rathore participated in third Indian Antarctic Expedition during 1983-84 and also visited over two dozen countries and delivered valuable service on finer aspects of inter relationship of weather & agriculture beside contributing to science diplomacy.

Dr Rathore, who is a Fellow of Indian Meteorological Society and also the Association of Agro-meteorologists, has published more than 100 research pater and written around a dozen books and many chapters in books. Even after retirement from active service of Government of India he is making immense contribution to society through his role as Member, Advisory Committee, National Disaster Management Authority, GOI, International Consultant of The World Bank, Consultant of the UNDP, President Society for Rural Improvement, National Vice President, Vigyan Bharti and various committees of Government of India.

Considering his vast experience in weather & climate prediction, early warning of extreme weather events, The World Bank has appointed Dr Rathore as International Consultant to assist the bank in improving weather & climate services in south Asia.

He is also serving on a number of committees of Government of India.

AWARDS & HONORS

Dr Rathore has been bestowed with many national & international recognitions and accolades for his outstanding contribution in the field of meteorology and its application to agriculture, disaster management including Appreciations of WMO for accurate prediction and warnings of cyclones and Indian Army for rendering excellent meteorological information support for defense expeditions. He is also recipient of Rajasthan Science Congress Award; Sohrab Godrez award for science & technology, by Rotary Club; Honorary Professor by Amity University, Jaipur; Vigyan Ratna by Vigyan Parishad Prayag; DD Kisan Samman by Doordarshan; Maharana Mewar Award; Marwar Ratna Award; Rajbhasha Shri Puraskar, and ICHL Award, beside other awards.

See also
 Meteorology
 India Meteorological Department
 National Centre for Medium Range Weather Forecasting
 Department of Science & Technology
 Ministry of Earth Sciences

References

1954 births
Living people
20th-century Indian earth scientists
Indian meteorologists